In mathematics, the essential spectrum of a bounded operator (or, more generally, of a densely defined closed linear operator) is a certain subset of its spectrum, defined by a condition of the type that says, roughly speaking, "fails badly to be invertible".

The essential spectrum of self-adjoint operators

In formal terms, let X be a Hilbert space and let T be a self-adjoint operator on X.

Definition

The essential spectrum of T, usually denoted σess(T), is the set of all complex numbers λ such that 

is not a Fredholm operator, where  denotes the identity operator on X, so that  for all x in X.
(An operator is Fredholm if its kernel and cokernel are finite-dimensional.)

Properties

The essential spectrum is always closed, and it is a subset of the spectrum. Since T is self-adjoint, the spectrum is contained on the real axis.

The essential spectrum is invariant under compact perturbations. That is, if K is a compact self-adjoint operator on X, then the essential spectra of T and that of  coincide. This explains why it is called the essential spectrum: Weyl (1910) originally defined the essential spectrum of a certain differential operator to be the spectrum independent of boundary conditions.

Weyl's criterion for the essential spectrum is as follows. First, a number λ is in the spectrum of T if and only if there exists a sequence {ψk} in the space X such that  and

Furthermore, λ is in the essential spectrum if there is a sequence satisfying this condition, but such that it contains no convergent subsequence (this is the case if, for example  is an orthonormal sequence); such a sequence is called a singular sequence.

The discrete spectrum

The essential spectrum is a subset of the spectrum σ, and its complement is called the discrete spectrum, so

If T is self-adjoint, then, by definition, a number λ is in the discrete spectrum of T if it is an isolated eigenvalue of finite multiplicity, meaning that the dimension of the space

has finite but non-zero dimension and that there is an ε > 0 such that μ ∈ σ(T) and |μ−λ| < ε imply that μ and λ are equal.
(For general nonselfadjoint operators in Banach spaces, by definition, a number  is in the discrete spectrum if it is a normal eigenvalue; or, equivalently, if it is an isolated point of the spectrum and the rank of the corresponding Riesz projector is finite.)

The essential spectrum of closed operators in Banach spaces

Let X be a Banach space
and let  be a closed linear operator on X with dense domain . There are several definitions of the essential spectrum, which are not equivalent. 
 The essential spectrum  is the set of all λ such that  is not semi-Fredholm (an operator is semi-Fredholm if its range is closed and its kernel or its cokernel is finite-dimensional).
 The essential spectrum  is the set of all λ such that  is not Fredholm (an operator is Fredholm if its range is closed and both its kernel and its cokernel are finite-dimensional).
 The essential spectrum  is the set of all λ such that  is not Fredholm with index zero (the index of a Fredholm operator is the difference between the dimension of the kernel and the dimension of the cokernel).
 The essential spectrum  is the union of σess,1(T) with all components of  that do not intersect with the resolvent set .

Furthermore,

and any of these inclusions may be strict. For self-adjoint operators, all the above definitions of the essential spectrum coincide.

Define the radius of the essential spectrum by

Even though the spectra may be different, the radius is the same for all k.

The definition of the set  is equivalent to Weyl's criterion:  is the set of all λ for which there exists a singular sequence.

The essential spectrum  is invariant under compact perturbations for k = 1,2,3,4, but not for k = 5.
The set  gives the part of the spectrum that is independent of compact perturbations, that is,

where  denotes the set of compact operators on X (D.E. Edmunds and W.D. Evans, 1987).

The spectrum of a closed densely defined operator T can be decomposed into a disjoint union
,
where  is the discrete spectrum of T.

See also
 Spectrum (functional analysis)
 Resolvent formalism
 Decomposition of spectrum (functional analysis)
 Discrete spectrum (mathematics)
 Spectrum of an operator
 Operator theory
 Fredholm theory

References 

The self-adjoint case is discussed in
 
 

A discussion of the spectrum for general operators can be found in
 D.E. Edmunds and W.D. Evans (1987), Spectral theory and differential operators, Oxford University Press. .

The original definition of the essential spectrum goes back to
 H. Weyl (1910), Über gewöhnliche Differentialgleichungen mit Singularitäten und die zugehörigen Entwicklungen willkürlicher Funktionen, Mathematische Annalen 68, 220–269.

Spectral theory